The , formerly , is an historic  ("tea house") in Kyoto, Japan. It is located at the southeast corner of Shijō Street and Hanami Lane, its entrance right at the heart of the Gion Kobu district.

It is considered an exclusive and high-end establishment; access is invitation only while its fame is often associated with the  event. The 9th teahouse proprietor is Jirou-emon Sugiura.

History
The Ichiriki is more than 300 years old, and has been a major centerpiece of Gion since the beginning of the entertainment district. Like other  in Gion, the Ichiriki is used to hold parties by geisha, the Ichiriki in particular having traditionally entertained men of political and business power.

The house is run by the  family, and the nameplate on the entrance gate reads , the name of the 9th generation head.

Name
The  curtains at the entrance feature the characters  and  printed in black on a dark red ground, arranged to resemble the character . Due to the play being a major success, this was then adopted by the house itself, yielding the present name.

The forty-seven 

The Ichiriki plays a part in the events of the Akō vendetta, an 18th century historical event described by some scholars as a Japanese "national legend". A group of samurai became masterless following the ritual suicide of their , who was sentenced to death for the crime of drawing a sword and injuring a man in the Imperial Palace. Kira Yoshinaka had made a series of verbal insults towards the samurai's master, inciting his attack, but was left unpunished; as a result of this, the masterless samurai plotted to assassinate Yoshinaka for over two years.

The samurai, led by Oishi Kuranosuke, realized they would be monitored for signs they were planning to enact revenge. Thus, in an effort to dissuade the suspecting parties and Imperial spies, they sent Kuranosuke to Kyoto, who spent many nights at the Ichiriki earning a reputation as a gambler and a drunkard. As Kuranosuke gave the appearance of becoming more and more relaxed and unprepared, Kira became less active in his suspicions and eventually relaxed his security. Because the Ichiriki provided the cover to mount an attack, the samurai were eventually successful in killing Yoshinaka, but were then forced to commit suicide themselves.

The fall of the 
As modernisation spread through Japan during the final years of the Edo period, unrest also spread within the country, with the age of the  coming to an end; a number of murders of foreigners had led to tension rising between Japan and the Western powers, and this international pressure led many to question the legitimacy of the 's rule.

Much of the plotting to overthrow the shogunate took place in secretive talks at the Ichiriki, disguised as innocent evenings with friends. The plans came to fruition in 1868 when the last  agreed to dissolve the shogunate at Nijō Castle.

Access
Access to the Ichiriki is the height of exclusivity; fierce ties to the teahouse must first be established before one can become a patron. Relationships to the teahouse can often be traced back generations, with only these patrons and their guests allowed in.

For a brief period of only a few nights in 2006, the Ichiriki, along with five other teahouses in Gion – one from each of the five Kyoto geisha districts – offered general access to a small number of tourists who were unaccompanied by patrons, as part of a tourism promotion program at the request of the Kyoto City Tourist Association.

Services offered

The Ichiriki does not prepare food, but customers can order catering à la carte, which is delivered to the house. Guests can also be shown around the house and see various decorations, such as a miniature display of the forty-seven  dating to around 1850.

Architecture
The Ichiriki is structured in the style of traditional Japanese architecture. The structure of the building is mostly wood, and is designed to protect the privacy of its patrons, with the interior gardens not visible from outside the complex. The building also features angled screens to prevent eavesdropping at walls.

Cultural references to the Ichiriki
 The establishment is a major setting in Arthur Golden's fictional portrayal of a Gion geisha's life in Memoirs of a Geisha, though Golden himself never visited the teahouse.
 The Ichiriki is a major setting in the kabuki play , depicting the story of the forty-seven .
 The play Ichiriki Teahouse centers around the plots against the  formulated at the Ichiriki.
 Former geisha Sayo Masuda mentions it several times in her work Autobiography of a Geisha, stating that "The Mistress of the Ichiriki was only thirty-four or thirty-five, but she once had been a geisha herself and had suffered terribly to get where she was, so she was kind to us in all sort of ways".

Notes

References

External links

祇園一力亭 (Gion Ichiriki-tei – article shows pictures of interior, a private dance show, and the house's matchbox) 
Ichiriki Chaya Photo Gallery

Buildings and structures in Kyoto
Geisha
Cultural history of Japan